Lhanbryde railway station served the village of Lhanbryde, Moray, Scotland from 1858 to 1964 on the Inverness and Aberdeen Junction Railway.

History 
The station opened on 18 August 1858 by the Inverness and Aberdeen Junction Railway. The station closed to both passengers and goods traffic on 7 December 1964. The site is now a private residence.

References

External links 

Disused railway stations in Moray
Railway stations in Great Britain opened in 1858
Railway stations in Great Britain closed in 1964
Former Highland Railway stations
Beeching closures in Scotland
1858 establishments in Scotland
1964 disestablishments in Scotland